This is a list of flag bearers who have represented Ceylon and Sri Lanka at the Olympics.

Flag bearers carry the national flag of their country at the opening ceremony of the Olympic Games.

See also
Sri Lanka at the Olympics

References

Sri Lanka at the Olympics
Sri Lanka
Olympic flagbearers